Homo erectus (meaning "upright man") is an extinct species of archaic human from the Pleistocene, with its earliest occurrence about 2 million years ago.. Its specimens are among the first recognizable members of the genus Homo. 

Several human species, such as H. heidelbergensis and H. antecessor appear to have evolved from H. erectus, and Neanderthals, Denisovans, and modern humans are in turn generally considered to have evolved from H. heidelbergensis. H. erectus was the first human ancestor to spread throughout Eurasia, with a continental range extending from the Iberian Peninsula to Java.  Asian populations of H. erectus may be ancestral to H. floresiensis and possibly to H. luzonensis. The last known population of H. erectus is H. e. soloensis from Java, around 117,000–108,000 years ago.

H. erectus had a more modern gait and body proportions, and was the first human species to have exhibited a flat face, prominent nose, and possibly sparse body hair coverage. Though brain size certainly exceeds that of ancestor species, capacity varied widely depending on the population. In earlier populations, brain development seems to cease early in childhood, suggesting that offspring were largely self-sufficient at birth, thus limiting cognitive development through life. H. erectus was an apex predator; sites generally show consumption of medium to large animals, such as bovines or elephants, and suggest the development of predatory behaviour and coordinated hunting. H. erectus is associated with the Acheulean stone tool industry, and is postulated to have been the earliest human ancestor capable of using fire, hunting and gathering in coordinated groups, caring for injured or sick group members, and possibly seafaring and art (though examples of art are controversial, and are otherwise rudimentary and few and far between).

H. erectus males and females may have been roughly the same size as each other (i.e. exhibited reduced sexual dimorphism), which could indicate monogamy in line with general trends exhibited in primates. It is unclear if H. erectus was anatomically capable of speech, though it is postulated they communicated using some proto-language.

Taxonomy

Naming

Despite what English naturalist Charles Darwin had hypothesised in his 1871 book Descent of Man, many late-19th century evolutionary naturalists postulated that Asia, not Africa, was the birthplace of humankind as it is midway between Europe and America, providing optimal dispersal routes throughout the world (the Out of Asia theory). Among these was German naturalist Ernst Haeckel, who argued that the first human species evolved on the now-disproven hypothetical continent "Lemuria" in what is now Southeast Asia, from a species he termed "Pithecanthropus alalus" ("speechless apeman"). "Lemuria" had supposedly sunk below the Indian Ocean, so no fossils could be found to prove this. Nevertheless, Haeckel's model inspired Dutch scientist Eugène Dubois to journey to the Dutch East Indies. Because no directed expedition had ever discovered human fossils (the few known had all been discovered by accident), and the economy was strained by the Long Depression, the Dutch government refused to fund Dubois. In 1887, he enlisted in the Dutch East India Army as a medical officer, and was able to secure a post in 1887 in the Indies to search for his "missing link" in his spare time. On Java, he found a skullcap in 1891 and a femur in 1892 (Java Man) dating to the late Pliocene or early Pleistocene at the Trinil site along the Solo River, which he named Pithecanthropus erectus ("upright apeman") in 1893. He attempted unsuccessfully to convince the European scientific community that he had found an upright-walking ape-man. Given few fossils of ancient humans had even been discovered at the time, they largely dismissed his findings as a malformed non-human ape.

The significance of these fossils would not be realized until the 1927 discovery of what Canadian palaeoanthropologist Davidson Black called "Sinanthropus pekinensis" (Peking Man) at the Zhoukoudian cave near Beijing, China. Black lobbied across North America and Europe for funding to continue excavating the site, which has since become the most productive H. erectus site in the world. Continued interest in Java led to further H. erectus fossil discoveries at Ngandong (Solo Man) in 1931, Mojokerto (Java Man) in 1936, and Sangiran (Java Man) in 1937. The Sangiran site yielded the best preserved Java Man skull. German paleoanthropologist Franz Weidenreich provided much of the detailed description of the Chinese specimens in several monographs. The original specimens were lost during the Second Sino-Japanese War after an attempt to smuggle them out of China for safekeeping. Only casts remain.

Similarities between Java Man and Peking Man led Ernst Mayr to rename both as Homo erectus in 1950. Throughout much of the 20th century, anthropologists debated the role of H. erectus in human evolution. Early in the century, due in part to the discoveries at Java and Zhoukoudian, the belief that modern humans first evolved in Asia was widely accepted. A few naturalists—Charles Darwin the most prominent among them—theorized that humans' earliest ancestors were African. Darwin had pointed out that chimpanzees and gorillas, humans' closest relatives, evolved and exist only in Africa.

In 1949, the species was reported in Swartkrans Cave, South Africa, by South African paleoanthropologists Robert Broom and John Talbot Robinson, who described it as "Telanthropus capensis". Homo fossils have also been reported from nearby caves, but their species designation has been a tumultuous discussion. A few North African sites have additionally yielded H. erectus remains, which at first were classified as "Atlantanthropus mauritanicus" in 1951. Beginning in the 1970s, propelled most notably by Richard Leakey, more were being unearthed in East Africa predominantly at the Koobi Fora site, Kenya, and Olduvai Gorge, Tanzania.

Archaic human fossils unearthed across Europe used to be assigned to H. erectus, but have since been separated as H. heidelbergensis as a result of namely British physical anthropologist Chris Stringer's work.

Evolution

It has been proposed that H. erectus evolved from H. habilis about 2 Mya, though this has been called into question because they coexisted for at least a half a million years. Alternatively, a group of H. habilis may have been reproductively isolated, and only this group developed into H. erectus (cladogenesis).

Because the earliest remains of H. erectus are found in both Africa and East Asia (in China as early as 2.1 Mya, in South Africa 2.04 Mya), it is debated where H. erectus evolved. A 2011 study suggested that it was H. habilis who reached West Asia from Africa, that early H. erectus developed there, and that early H. erectus would then have dispersed from West Asia to East Asia (Peking Man), Southeast Asia (Java Man), back to Africa (Homo ergaster), and to Europe (Tautavel Man), eventually evolving into modern humans in Africa. Others have suggested that H. erectus/H. ergaster developed in Africa, where it eventually evolved into modern humans.

H. erectus had reached Sangiran, Java, by 1.8 Mya, and a second and distinct wave of H. erectus had colonized Zhoukoudian, China, about 780 kya. Early teeth from Sangiran are bigger and more similar to those of basal (ancestral) Western H. erectus and H. habilis than to those of the derived Zhoukoudian H. erectus. However, later Sangiran teeth seem to reduce in size, which could indicate a secondary colonization event of Java by the Zhoukoudian or some closely related population.

Subspecies
 Homo erectus erectus (Java Man, 1.6–0.5 Ma)
 Homo erectus ergaster (1.9–1.4 Ma)
 Homo erectus georgicus (1.8–1.6 Ma)
 Homo erectus lantianensis (Lantian Man, 1.6 Ma)
 Homo erectus nankinensis (Nanjing Man, 0.6 Ma)
 Homo erectus pekinensis (Peking Man, 0.7 Ma)
 Homo erectus soloensis (Solo Man, 0.546–0.143 Ma)
 Homo erectus tautavelensis (Tautavel Man, 0.45 Ma)
 Homo erectus yuanmouensis (Yuanmou Man)

"Wushan Man" was proposed as Homo erectus wushanensis, but is now thought to be based upon fossilized fragments of an extinct non-hominin ape.

Since its discovery in 1893 (Java man), there has been a trend in palaeoanthropology of reducing the number of proposed species of Homo, to the point where H. erectus includes all early (Lower Paleolithic) forms of Homo sufficiently derived from H. habilis and
distinct from early H. heidelbergensis (in Africa also known as H. rhodesiensis). It is sometimes considered as a wide-ranging, polymorphous species.

Due to such a wide range of variation, it has been suggested that the ancient H. rudolfensis and H. habilis should be considered early varieties of H. erectus. The primitive H. e. georgicus from Dmanisi, Georgia has the smallest brain capacity of any known Pleistocene hominin (about 600 cc), and its inclusion in the species would greatly expand the range of variation of H. erectus to perhaps include species as H. rudolfensis, H. gautengensis, H. ergaster, and perhaps H. habilis. However, a 2015 study suggested that H. georgicus represents an earlier, more primitive species of Homo derived from an older dispersal of hominins from Africa, with H. ergaster/erectus possibly deriving from a later dispersal. H. georgicus is sometimes not even regarded as H. erectus.

It is debated whether the African H. e. ergaster is a separate species (and that H. erectus evolved in Asia, then migrated to Africa), or is the African form (sensu lato) of H. erectus (sensu stricto). In the latter, H. ergaster has also been suggested to represent the immediate ancestor of H. erectus. It has also been suggested that H. ergaster instead of H. erectus, or some hybrid between the two, was the immediate ancestor of other archaic humans and modern humans. It has been proposed that Asian H. erectus have several unique characteristics from non-Asian populations (autapomorphies), but there is no clear consensus on what these characteristics are or if they are indeed limited to only Asia. Based on supposed derived characteristics, the 120 ka Javan H. e. soloensis has been proposed to have speciated from H. erectus, as H. soloensis, but this has been challenged because most of the basic cranial features are maintained.

In a wider sense, H. erectus had mostly been replaced by H. heidelbergensis by about 300 kya, with possible late survival of H. erectus soloensis in Java an estimated 117-108kya.

Descendants and synonyms

Homo erectus is the most long-lived species of Homo, having survived for almost two million years. By contrast, Homo sapiens emerged about a third of a million years ago.

Regarding many archaic humans, there is no definite consensus as to whether they should be classified as subspecies of H. erectus or H. sapiens or as separate species.
 African H. erectus candidates
 Homo ergaster ("African H. erectus")
 Homo naledi (or H. e. naledi)
 Eurasian H. erectus candidates:
 Homo antecessor (or H. e. antecessor)
 Homo heidelbergensis (or H. e. heidelbergensis)
 Homo cepranensis (or H. e. cepranensis)
 Homo floresiensis
 Homo sapiens candidates
 Homo neanderthalensis (or H. s. neanderthalensis)
 Denisovans (or Homo sp. 'Denisova' H. sapiens ssp. 'Denisova' or H. sp. 'Altai')
 Homo rhodesiensis (or H. s. rhodesiensis)
 Homo heidelbergensis (or H. s. heidelbergensis)
 Homo sapiens idaltu
 the Narmada fossil, discovered in 1982 in Madhya Pradesh, India, was at first suggested as H. erectus (Homo erectus narmadensis) but later recognized as H. sapiens.

Meganthropus, based on fossils found in Java, dated to between 1.4 and 0.9 Mya, was tentatively grouped with H. erectus in contrast to earlier interpretations of it as a giant species of early human although older literature has placed the fossils outside of Homo altogether. However, Zanolli et al. (2019) judged Meganthropus to be a distinct genus of extinct ape.

Anatomy

Head

Homo erectus featured a flat face compared to earlier hominins; pronounced brow ridge; and a low, flat skull. The presence of sagittal, frontal, and coronal keels, which are small crests that run along these suture lines, has been proposed to be evidence of significant thickening of the skull, specifically the cranial vault. CT scan analyses reveal this to not be the case. However, the squamous part of occipital bone, particularly the internal occipital crest, at the rear of the skull is notably thicker than that of modern humans, likely a basal (ancestral) trait. The fossil record indicates that H. erectus was the first human species to have featured a projecting nose, which is generally thought to have evolved in response to breathing dry air in order to retain moisture. American psychologist Lucia Jacobs hypothesized that the projecting nose instead allowed for distinguishing the direction different smells come from (stereo olfaction) to facilitate navigation and long-distance migration.

However, markedly smaller specimens have been found in Dmanisi, Georgia (H. e. georgicus); Koobi Fora and Olorgesailie, Kenya; and possibly Gona, Ethiopia.

In an article published in 2021 titled 'Interpopulational variation in human brain size: implications for hominin cognitive phylogeny' it was found that the brain size of Asian H. erectus over the last 600,000 years overlaps significantly with modern human populations. Significantly, some small brained modern populations showed greater affinity with H. erectus than they did with other large brained and large bodied modern populations. The paper points out methodological flaws in current understanding of brain size increase in human evolution, where species averages are compared with fossils, which overlooks interpopulational variation. It also overlooks the fact that some modern populations have not seen any dramatic brain size increase relative to H. erectus with most of the increase occurring in European populations, which has the result of obscuring interpopulational variation. As the authors write '...the increase in the mean of H. sapiens cranial capacity is to a large extent due to an increase in the upper limit with a much less pronounced increase in the lower limit relative to our H. erectus sample. And this increase in the upper limit seems to be more pronounced in European populations – which may be a result of correlated increases in body size  in  addition  to  climatic  factors'. Consequently, the authors argue that purely based on brain size similarities, Asian H. erectus could be re-classified as a subspecies of H. sapiens, that is H. sapiens soloensis - as was suggested by earlier authors.

Dentally, H. erectus have the thinnest enamel of any Plio–Pleistocene hominin. Enamel prevents the tooth from breaking from hard foods, but impedes shearing through tough foods. The bodies of the mandibles of H. erectus, and all early Homo, are thicker than those of modern humans and all living apes. The mandibular body resists torsion from the bite force or chewing, meaning their jaws could produce unusually powerful stresses while eating, but the practical application of this is unclear. Nonetheless, the mandibular bodies of H. erectus are somewhat thinner than those of early Homo. The premolars and molars also have a higher frequency of pits than H. habilis, suggesting H. erectus ate more brittle foods (which cause pitting). These all indicate that the H. erectus mouth was less capable of processing hard foods and more at shearing through tougher foods, thus reducing the variety of foods it could process, likely as a response to tool use.

Body
 
Among primates, this marked of a response to environmental stressors (phenotypic plasticity) is only demonstrated in modern humans.

Like modern humans and unlike other great apes, there does not seem to have been a great size disparity between H. erectus males and females (size-specific sexual dimorphism), though there is not much fossil data regarding this. Brain size in two adults from Koobi Fora measured , and another significantly smaller adult measured , which could possibly indicate sexual dimorphism, though sex was undetermined. Another case that depicts the difficulty of assigning sex to the fossil record is a few samples taken in Olduvai Gorge. In 1960, in Olduvai Gorge two skulls identified as OH12 and OH9, were found to be that of H. erectus with a cranial capacities of 1000 cc and 700 cc. It is unclear if sexual dimorphism is at play here since the remains are fragmentary. If H. erectus did not exhibit sexual dimorphism, then it is possible that they were the first in the human line to do so, though the fragmentary fossil record for earlier species makes this unclear. If yes, then there was a substantial and sudden increase in female height. Certain features of sexual dimorphism are often identified in the possibility of determining sex such as lack of muscle marking.

H. erectus had about the same limb configurations and proportions as modern humans, implying humanlike locomotion, the first in the Homo lineage. H. erectus tracks near Ileret, Kenya, also indicate a human gait. A humanlike shoulder suggests an ability for high speed throwing. It was once thought that Turkana boy had 6 lumbar vertebra instead of the 5 seen in modern humans and 11 instead of 12 thoracic vertebrae, but this has since been revised, and the specimen is now considered to have exhibited a humanlike curvature of the spine (lordosis) and the same number of respective vertebrae.

It is largely unclear when human ancestors lost most of their body hair. Genetic analysis suggests that high activity in the melanocortin 1 receptor, which would produce dark skin, dates back to 1.2 Mya. This could indicate the evolution of hairlessness around this time, as a lack of body hair would have left the skin exposed to harmful UV radiation. It is possible that exposed skin only became maladaptive in the Pleistocene, because the increasing tilt of the Earth (which also caused the ice ages) would have increased solar radiation bombardment- which would suggest that hairlessness first emerged in the australopithecines. However, australopithecines seem to have lived at much higher, much colder elevations—typically  where the nighttime temperature can drop to —so they may have required hair to stay warm, unlike early Homo which inhabited lower, hotter elevations. Populations in higher latitudes potentially developed lighter skin to prevent vitamin D deficiency. A 500–300 ka H. erectus specimen from Turkey was diagnosed with the earliest known case of tuberculous meningitis, which is typically exacerbated in dark-skinned people living in higher latitudes due to vitamin D deficiency. Hairlessness is generally thought to have facilitated sweating, but reduction of parasite load and sexual selection have also been proposed.

Metabolism

The 1.8 Ma Mojokerto child specimen from Java, who died at about 1 year of age, presented 72–84% of the average adult brain size, which is more similar to the faster brain growth trajectory of great apes than modern humans. This indicates that H. erectus was probably not cognitively comparable to modern humans, and that secondary altriciality—an extended childhood and long period of dependency due to the great amount of time required for brain maturation—evolved much later in human evolution, perhaps in the modern human/Neanderthal last common ancestor. However, a 1.8 Ma female pelvis from Gona, Ethiopia, shows that H. erectus babies with a brain volume of  could have been safely delivered, which is 34–36% the mean adult size, compared to 40% in chimps and 28% in modern humans. This more aligns with the conclusions drawn from the Mojokerto child. A faster development rate could indicate a lower expected lifespan.

This is similar to that of earlier Homo, despite a marked increase in activity and migratory capacity, likely because the longer legs of H. erectus were more energy-efficient in long-distance movement. Nonetheless, the estimate for H. erectus females is 84% higher than that for Australopithecus females, possibly due to an increased body size and a decreased growth rate. A 2011 study, assuming high energy or dietary fat requirements based on the abundance of large game animals at H. erectus sites, calculated a TEE of 2,700–3,400 kcal of which 27–44% derived from fat, and 44–62% of the fat from animal sources. In comparison, modern humans with a similar activity level have a DEE of 2,450 calories, of which 33% derives from fat, and 49% of the fat from animals.

Bone thickness

The cortical bone (the outer layer of the bone) is extraordinarily thickened, particularly in East Asian populations. The skullcaps have oftentimes been confused with fossil turtle carapaces, and the medullary canal in the long bones (where the bone marrow is stored, in the limbs) is extremely narrowed (medullary stenosis). This degree of thickening is usually exhibited in semi-aquatic animals which used their heavy (pachyosteosclerotic) bones as ballasts to help them sink, induced by hypothyroidism. Male specimens have thicker cortical bone than females.

It is largely unclear what function this could have served. All pathological inducers would leave scarring or some other indicator not normally exhibited in H. erectus. Before more complete skeletons were discovered, Weidenreich suggested H. erectus was a gigantic species, thickened bone required to support the massive weight. It was hypothesised that intense physical activity could have induced bone thickening, but in 1970, human biologist Stanley Marion Garn demonstrated there is a low correlation between the two at least in modern humans. Garn instead noted different races have different average cortical bone thicknesses, and concluded it is genetic rather than environmental. It is unclear if the condition is caused by increased bone apposition (bone formation) or decreased bone resorption, but Garn noted the stenosis is quite similar to the congenital condition in modern humans induced by hyper-apposition. In 1985, biological anthropologist Gail Kennedy argued for resorption as a result of hyperparathyroidism caused by hypocalcemia (calcium deficiency), a consequence of a dietary shift to low-calcium meat. Kennedy could not explain why the calcium metabolism of H. erectus never adjusted. In 1985, American palaeoanthropologist Mary Doria Russell and colleagues argued the supraorbital torus is a response to withstanding major bending moment which localises in that region when significant force is applied through the front teeth, such as while using the mouth as a third hand to carry objects.

In 2004, Noel Boaz and Russel Ciochon suggested it was a result of a cultural practice, wherein H. erectus would fight each other with fists, stones, or clubs to settle disputes or battle for mates, since the skull is reinforced in key areas. The mandible is quite robust, capable of absorbing heavy blows (no "glass jaw"); the heavy brow ridge protects the eyes, and transitions into a bar covering the ears, connecting all the way in the back of the skull, meaning blows to any of these regions can be effectively dissipated across the skull; and the sagittal keel protects the top of the braincase. Many skullcaps bear usually debilitating fractures, such as the Peking Man skull X, yet they can show signs of surviving and healing. Anthropologist Peter Brown suggested a similar reason for the unusual thickening of the modern Australian Aboriginal skull, a result of a ritual popular in central and southeast Australian tribes where adversaries would wack each other with waddies (sticks) until knockout.

Culture

Social structure

The only fossil evidence regarding H. erectus group composition comes from 4 sites outside of Ileret, Kenya, where 97 footprints made 1.5 Mya were likely left by a group of at least 20 individuals. One of these trackways, based on the size of the footprints, may have been an entirely male group, which could indicate they were some specialised task group, such as a hunting or foraging party, or a border patrol. If correct, this would also indicate sexual division of labour, which distinguishes human societies from those of other great apes and social mammalian carnivores. In modern hunter gatherer societies who target large prey items, typically male parties are dispatched to bring down these high-risk animals, and, due to the low success rate, female parties focus on more predictable foods. Based on modern day savanna chimp and baboon group composition and behaviour, H. erectus ergaster may have lived in large, multi-male groups in order to defend against large savanna predators in the open and exposed environment. However, dispersal patterns indicate that H. erectus generally avoided areas with high carnivore density. It is possible that male–male bonding and male–female friendships were important societal aspects.

Because H. erectus children had faster brain growth rates, H. erectus likely did not exhibit the same degree of maternal investment or child-rearing behaviours as modern humans.

Because H. erectus males and females are thought to have been about the same size compared to other great apes (exhibit less size-specific sexual dimorphism), it is generally hypothesised that they lived in a monogamous society, as reduced sexual dimorphism in primates is typically correlated with this mating system. However, it is unclear if H. erectus did in fact exhibit humanlike rates of sexual dimorphism. If they did, then it would mean only female height increased from the ancestor species, which could have been caused by a shift in female fertility or diet, and/or reduced pressure on males for large size. This in turn could imply a shift in female behaviour which made it difficult for males to maintain a harem.

Food
Increasing brain size is often directly associated with a meatier diet and resultant higher caloric intake. Human entomophagy and therefore an increase in protein consumption through insects has also been proposed as a possible cause. However, it is also possible that the energy-expensive guts decreased in size in H. erectus, because the large ape gut is used to synthesize fat by fermenting plant matter which was replaced by dietary animal fat, allowing more energy to be diverted to brain growth. This would have increased brain size indirectly while maintaining the same caloric requirements of ancestor species. H. erectus may have also been the first to use a hunting and gathering food collecting strategy as a response to the increasing dependence on meat. With an emphasis on teamwork, division of labor, and food sharing, hunting and gathering was a dramatically different subsistence strategy from previous modes.

H. erectus sites frequently are associated with assemblages of medium- to large-sized game, namely elephants, rhinos, hippos, bovine, and boar. H. erectus would have had considerable leftovers, potentially pointing to food sharing or long-term food preservation (such as by drying) if most of the kill was indeed utilized. It is possible that H. erectus grew to become quite dependent on large-animal meat, and the disappearance of H. erectus from the Levant is correlated with the local extinction of the straight-tusked elephant. Nonetheless, H. erectus diet likely varied widely depending upon location. For example, at the 780 ka Gesher Benot Ya'aqov site, Israel, the inhabitants gathered and ate 55 different types of fruits, vegetables, seeds, nuts, and tubers, and it appears that they used fire to roast certain plant materials that otherwise would have been inedible; they also consumed amphibians, reptiles, birds, aquatic and terrestrial invertebrates, in addition to the usual large creatures such as elephant and fallow deer. At the 1.95 Ma FwJJ20 lakeside site in the East Turkana Basin, Kenya, the inhabitants ate (alongside the usual bovids, hippos, and rhinos) aquatic creatures such as turtles, crocodiles, and catfish. The large animals were likely scavenged at this site, but the turtles and fish were possibly collected live. In East Africa between 2.0 and 1.4 Ma, carcasses of -grazing ungulates, particularly alcelaphins, featured increasingly prominently in the diet of these hominins. At the 1.5 Ma Trinil H. K. site, Java, H. erectus likely gathered fish and shellfish.

Dentally, H. erectus mouths were not as versatile as those of ancestor species, capable of processing a narrower range of foods. However, tools were likely used to process hard foods, thus affecting the chewing apparatus, and this combination may have instead increased dietary flexibility (though this does not equate to a highly varied diet). Such versatility may have permitted H. erectus to inhabit a range of different environments, and migrate beyond Africa.

In 1999, British anthropologist Richard Wrangham proposed the "cooking hypothesis" which states that H. erectus speciated from the ancestral H. habilis because of fire usage and cooking 2 Million years ago to explain the rapid doubling of brain size between these two species in only a 500,000 year timespan, and the sudden appearance of the typical human body plan. Cooking makes protein more easily digestible, speeds up nutrient absorption, and destroys food-borne pathogens, which would have increased the environment's natural carrying capacity, allowing group size to expand, causing selective pressure for sociality, requiring greater brain function. However, the fossil record does not associate the emergence of H. erectus with fire usage nor with any technological breakthrough for that matter, and cooking likely did not become a common practice until after 400 kya.

Java Man's dispersal through Southeast Asia coincides with the extirpation of the giant turtle Megalochelys, possibly due to overhunting as the turtle would have been an easy, slow-moving target which could have been stored for quite some time.

Technology

Tool production

Though larger and heavier, these hand axes had sharper, chiseled edges. They were likely multi-purpose tools, used in variety of activities such as cutting meat, wood, or edible plants. In 1979, American paleontologist Thomas Wynn stated that Acheulean technology required operational intelligence (foresight and planning), being markedly more complex than Oldowan technology which included lithics of unstandardized shape, cross-sections, and symmetry. Based on this, he concluded that there is not a significant disparity in intelligence between H. erectus and modern humans and that, for the last 300,000 years, increasing intelligence has not been a major influencer of cultural evolution. However, a 1 year old H. erectus specimen shows that this species lacked an extended childhood required for greater brain development, indicating lower cognitive capabilities. A few sites, likely due to occupation over several generations, features hand axes en masse, such as at Melka Kunture, Ethiopia; Olorgesailie, Kenya; Isimila, Tanzania; and Kalambo Falls, Zambia.

The earliest record of Acheulean technology comes from West Turkana, Kenya 1.76 Mya. Oldowan lithics are also known from the site, and the two seemed to coexist for some time. The earliest records of Acheulean technology outside of Africa date to no older than 1 Mya, indicating it only became widespread after some secondary H. erectus dispersal from Africa.

On Java, H. erectus produced tools from shells at Sangiran and Trinil.

Fire

H. erectus is credited as the first human ancestor to have used fire, though the timing of this invention is debated mainly because campfires very rarely and very poorly preserve over long periods of time, let alone thousands or millions of years. The earliest claimed fire sites are in Kenya, FxJj20 at Koobi Fora and GnJi 1/6E in the Chemoigut Formation, as far back as 1.5 Mya, and in South Africa, Wonderwerk Cave, 1.7 Mya. The first firekeepers are thought to have simply transported to caves and maintained naturally occurring fires for extended periods of time or only sporadically when the opportunity arose. Maintaining fires would require firekeepers to have knowledge on slow-burning materials such as dung. Fire becomes markedly more abundant in the wider archaeological record after 400,000–300,000 years ago, which can be explained as some advancement in fire management techniques took place at this time or human ancestors only opportunistically used fire until this time. It is possible that firestarting was invented and lost and reinvented multiple times and independently by different communities rather than being invented in one place and spreading throughout the world. The earliest evidence of hearths comes from Gesher Benot Ya'aqov, Israel, over 700,000 years ago, where fire is recorded in multiple layers in an area close to water, both uncharacteristic of natural fires.

Artificial lighting may have led to increased waking hours—modern humans have about a 16-hour waking period, whereas other apes are generally awake from only sunup to sundown—and these additional hours were probably used for socializing. Because of this, fire usage is probably also linked to the origin of language. Artificial lighting may have also made sleeping on the ground instead of the trees possible by keeping terrestrial predators at bay.

Migration into the frigid climate of Ice Age Europe may have only been possible because of fire, but evidence of fire usage in Europe until about 400–300,000 years ago is notably absent. If these early European H. erectus did not have fire, it is largely unclear how they stayed warm, avoided predators, and prepared animal fat and meat for consumption. There was also a lower likelihood of naturally occurring fires due to lightning being less common in areas further north. It is possible that they only knew how to maintain fires in certain settings in the landscapes and prepared food some distance away from home, meaning evidence of fire and evidence of hominin activity are spaced far apart. Alternatively, H. erectus may have only pushed farther north during warmer interglacial periods—thus not requiring fire, food storage, or clothing technology— and their dispersal patterns indicate they generally stayed in warmer lower-to-middle latitudes. It is debated if the H. e. pekinensis inhabitants of Zhoukoudian, Northern China, were capable of controlling fires as early as 770 kya to stay warm in what may have been a relatively cold climate.

Construction 

In 1962, a  circle made with volcanic rocks was discovered in Olduvai Gorge. British palaeoanthropologist Mary Leakey suggested the rock piles were used to support poles stuck into the ground, possibly to support a windbreak or a rough hut. Some modern day nomadic tribes build similar low-lying rock walls to build temporary shelters upon, bending upright branches as poles and using grasses or animal hide as a screen. Dating to 1.75 Mya, it is the oldest claimed evidence of architecture.

In Europe, evidence of constructed dwelling structures dating to or following the Holstein Interglacial (which began 424 kya) has been claimed in Bilzingsleben, Germany; Terra Amata, France; and Fermanville and Saint-Germain-des-Vaux in Normandy. The oldest evidence of a dwelling (and a campfire) in Europe comes from Přezletice, Czech Republic, 700 kya during the Cromerian Interglacial.

The earliest evidence of cave habitation is Wonderwerk Cave, South Africa, about 1.6 Mya, but evidence of cave use globally is sporadic until about 600 kya.

Clothing

It is largely unclear when clothing was invented, with the earliest estimate stretching as far back as 3 Mya to compensate for a lack of insulating body hair. It is known that head lice and body lice (the latter can only inhabit clothed individuals) for modern humans diverged about 170 kya, well before modern humans left Africa, meaning clothes were already well in use before encountering cold climates. One of the first uses of animal hide is thought to have been for clothing, and the oldest hide scrapers date to about 780 kya, though this is not indicative of clothing.

Seafaring
Acheulean artifacts discovered on isolated islands that were never connected to land in the Pleistocene may show seafaring by H. erectus as early as 1 Mya in Indonesia. They had arrived on the islands of Flores, Timor, and Roti, which would have necessitated crossing the Lombok Strait (the Wallace Line), at least before 800 kya. It is also possible they were the first European mariners as well and crossed the Strait of Gibraltar between North Africa and Spain. A 2021 genetic analysis of these island populations of H. erectus found no evidence of interbreeding with modern humans. Seafaring capability would show H. erectus had a great capacity for planning, likely months in advance of the trip.

Similarly, Homo luzonensis is dated between 771,000 and 631,000 years ago. Because Luzon has always been an island in the Quaternary, the ancestors of H. luzonensis would have had to have made a substantial sea crossing and crossed the Huxley Line.

Healthcare

The earliest probable example of infirming sick group members is a 1.77 Ma H. e. georgicus specimen who had lost all but one tooth due to age or gum disease, the earliest example of severe chewing impairment, yet still survived for several years afterwards. However, it is possible australopithecines were capable of caring for debilitated group members. Unable to chew, this H. e. georgicus individual probably ate soft plant or animal foods possibly with assistance from other group members. High-latitude groups are thought to have been predominantly carnivorous, eating soft tissue such as bone marrow or brains, which may have increased survival rates for toothless individuals.

The 1.5 Ma Turkana boy was diagnosed with juvenile spinal disc herniation, and, because this specimen was still growing, this caused some scoliosis (abnormal curving of the spine). These usually cause recurrent lower back pain and sciatica (pain running down the leg), and likely restricted Turkana boy in walking, bending, and other daily activities. The specimen appears to have survived into adolescence, which evidences advanced group care.

The 1,000–700 ka Java man specimen presents a noticeable osteocyte on the femur, likely Paget's disease of bone, and osteopetrosis, thickening of the bone, likely resulting from skeletal fluorosis caused by ingestion of food contaminated by fluorine-filled volcanic ash (as the specimen was found in ash-filled strata). Livestock that grazes on volcanic ash ridden fields typically die of acute intoxication within a few days or weeks.

Art and rituals 

An engraved Pseudodon shell DUB1006-fL with geometric markings could possibly be evidence of the earliest art-making, dating back to 546–436 kya. Art-making capabilities could be considered evidence of symbolic thinking, which is associated with modern cognition and behavior. In 1976, American archeologist Alexander Marshack asserted that engraved lines on an ox rib, associated with Acheulean lithics, from Pech de l'Azé, France, are similar to a meander design found in modern human Upper Paleolithic cave art. Three ostrich eggshell beads associated with Achuelian lithics were found in northwestern Africa, the earliest disc beads ever found, and Acheulian disc beads have also been found in France and Israel. The Middle Pleistocene "Venus of Tan-Tan" and "Venus of Berekhat Ram" are postulated to been crafted by H. erectus to resemble a human form. They were mostly formed by natural weathering, but slightly modified to emphasize certain grooves to suggest hairline, limbs, and eyes. The former has traces of pigments on the front side, possibly indicating it was colored.

H. erectus was also the earliest human to have intentionally collected red-colored pigments, namely ochre, recorded as early as the Middle Pleistocene. Ochre lumps at Olduvai Gorge, Tanzania—associated with the 1.4 Ma Olduvai Hominid 9—and Ambrona, Spain—which dates to 424–374 kya—were suggested to have been struck by a hammerstone and purposefully shaped and trimmed. At Terra Amata, France—which dates to 425–400 or 355–325 kya—red, yellow, and brown ochres were recovered in association with pole structures; ochre was probably heated to achieve such a wide color range. As it is unclear if H. erectus could have used ochre for any practical application, ochre collection might indicate that H. erectus was the earliest human to have exhibited a sense of aesthetics and to think beyond simply survival. Later human species are postulated to have used ochre as body paint, but in the case of H. erectus, it is contested if body paint was used so early in time. Further, it is unclear if these few examples are not simply isolated incidents of ochre use, as ochre is much more prevalent in Middle and Upper Paleolithic sites attributed to Neanderthals and H. sapiens.

In 1935, Jewish German anthropologist Franz Weidenreich speculated that the inhabitants of the Chinese Zhoukoudian Peking Man site were members of some Lower Paleolithic Skull Cult because the skulls all showed fatal blows to the head, breaking in of the foramen magnum at the base of the skull, by-and-large lack of preserved facial aspects, an apparently consistent pattern of breaking on the mandible, and a lack of post-cranial remains (elements that are not the skull). He believed that the inhabitants were headhunters, and smashed open the skulls and ate the brains of their victims. However, scavenging animals and natural forces such as flooding can also inflict the same kind of damage to skulls, and there is not enough evidence to suggest manhunting or cannibalism.

In 1999, British science writers Marek Kohn and Steven Mithen said that many hand axes exhibit no wear and were produced en masse, and concluded that these symmetrical, tear-drop shaped lithics functioned primarily as display tools so males could prove their fitness to females in some courting ritual, and were discarded afterwards. However, an apparent lack of reported wearing is likely due to a lack of use-wear studies, and only a few sites yield an exorbitant sum of hand axes likely due to gradual accumulation over generations instead of mass production.

Language
In 1984, the vertebral column of the 1.6 Ma adolescent Turkana boy indicated that this individual did not have properly developed respiratory muscles in order to produce speech. In 2001, American anthropologists Bruce Latimer and James Ohman concluded that Turkana boy was afflicted by skeletal dysplasia and scoliosis. In 2006, American anthropologist Marc Meyer and colleagues described a 1.8 Ma H. e. georgicus specimen as having a spine within the range of variation of modern human spines, contending that Turkana boy had spinal stenosis and was thus not representative of the species. Also, because he considered H. e. georgicus ancestral to all non-African H. erectus, Meyer concluded that the respiratory muscles of all H. erectus (at least non-ergaster) would not have impeded vocalisation or speech production. However, in 2013 and 2014, anthropologist Regula Schiess and colleagues concluded that there is no evidence of any congenital defects in Turkana boy, and considered the specimen representative of the species.

Neurologically, all Homo have similarly configured brains, and, likewise, the Broca's and Wernicke's areas (in charge of sentence formulation and speech production in modern humans) of H. erectus were comparable to those of modern humans. However, this is not indicative of anything in terms of speech capability as even large chimpanzees can have similarly expanded Broca's area, and it is unclear if these areas served as language centers in archaic humans. A 1-year-old H. erectus specimen shows that an extended childhood to allow for brain growth, which is a prerequisite in language acquisition, was not exhibited in this species.

The hyoid bone supports the tongue and makes possible modulation of the vocal tract to control pitch and volume. A 400 ka H. erectus hyoid bone from Castel di Guido, Italy, is bar-shaped—more similar to that of other Homo than to that of non-human apes and Australopithecus—but is devoid of muscle impressions, has a shield-shaped body, and is implied to have had reduced greater horns, meaning H. erectus lacked a humanlike vocal apparatus and thus anatomical prerequisites for a modern human level of speech. Increasing brain size and cultural complexity in tandem with technological refinement, and the hypothesis that articulate Neanderthals and modern humans may have inherited speech capabilities from the last common ancestor, could possibly indicate that H. erectus used some proto-language and built the basic framework which fully fledged languages would eventually be built around. However, this ancestor may have instead been H. heidelbergensis, as a hyoid bone of a 530 ka H. heidelbergensis specimen from the Spanish Sima de los Huesos Cave is like that of modern humans, and another specimen from the same area shows an auditory capacity sensitive enough to pick up human speech.

Extinction

The last known occurrence of Homo erectus is 117,000–108,000 years ago in Ngandong, Java according to a study published in 2019.

In 2020 researchers reported that Homo erectus and Homo heidelbergensis lost more than half of their climate niche – climate they were adapted to –, with no corresponding reduction in physical range, just before extinction and that climate change played a substantial role in extinctions of past Homo species.

Fossils

The lower cave of the Zhoukoudian cave, China, is one of the most important archaeological sites worldwide. There have been remains of 45 homo erectus individuals found and thousands of tools recovered. Most of these remains were lost during World War 2, with the exception of two postcranial elements that were rediscovered in China in 1951 and four human teeth from 'Dragon Bone Hill'.

New evidence has shown that Homo erectus does not have uniquely thick vault bones, as was previously thought. Testing showed that neither Asian nor African Homo erectus had uniquely large vault bones.

Individual fossils 
Some of the major Homo erectus fossils:
 Indonesia (island of Java): Trinil 2 (holotype), Sangiran collection, Sambungmachan collection, Ngandong collection
 China ("Peking Man"): Lantian (Gongwangling and Chenjiawo), Yunxian, Zhoukoudian, Nanjing, Hexian
 Kenya: KNM ER 3883, KNM ER 3733
 Vietnam: Northern, Tham Khuyen, Hoa Binh
 Republic of Georgia: Dmanisi collection ("Homo erectus georgicus")
 Ethiopia: Daka calvaria
 Eritrea: Buia cranium (possibly H. ergaster)
 Denizli Province, Turkey: Kocabas fossil
 Drimolen, South Africa: DNH 134

Phylogeny 
A cladogram of Homo erectus is as follows. It is indicated how many million years ago the clades diverged.

Homo erectus was originally African. The extant Homo heidelbergensis (cladistically granting Homo sapiens), which was originally African, emerged within the Asian Homo erectus. Contemporary groups appear to have been interbreeding, so any phylogeny like this only gives a coarse impression of the evolution of Homo, and extinct lineage may have partially continued in other groupings. Not included are other contemporary groups such as Homo floresiensis, Homo naledi, Homo luzonensis, Homo rudolfensis, Australopithecus sediba, Australopithecus africanus, and Paranthropus.

Gallery

See also 
 Anthropopithecus
 Kozarnika, Dimovo Municipality
 Multiregional origin of modern humans

General:
 List of fossil sites (with link directory)
 List of human evolution fossils (with images)

References

Further reading

External links 

 Homo erectus Origins – Exploring the Fossil Record – Bradshaw Foundation
 Archaeology Info
 Homo erectus – The Smithsonian Institution's Human Origins Program
 Possible co-existence with Homo Habilis – BBC News
 John Hawks's discussion of the Kocabas fossil
 Peter Brown's Australian and Asian Palaeoanthropology
 The Age of Homo erectus – Interactive Map of the Journey of Homo erectus out of Africa
 Human Timeline (Interactive) – Smithsonian, National Museum of Natural History (August 2016).

 
Fossil taxa described in 1892
Mammals described in 1892
Pliocene primates
Pleistocene primates
Pleistocene mammals of Africa
Prehistoric Indonesia
Prehistoric China
Prehistoric India
Prehistoric Kenya
Prehistoric Tanzania
Prehistoric Hungary
Prehistoric Vietnam
Prehistoric Georgia (country)
Prehistoric Ethiopia
Prehistoric Eritrea
Prehistoric Anatolia
Prehistoric Spain
Pleistocene mammals of Asia
Pleistocene mammals of Europe
Taxa named by Eugène Dubois
Tool-using mammals
Early species of Homo
Fossil taxa described in 1893